New York's 138th State Assembly district is one of the 150 districts in the New York State Assembly. It has been represented by Harry Bronson since 2011.

Geography
District 138 is in Monroe County. It contains part of the city of Rochester and the towns of Henrietta and Chili.

Recent election results

2020

2018

2016

2014

2012

References

Monroe County, New York
138